Moyla Kagaj (English: The Dirty Paper) is a Bengali social drama film directed by Premendra Mitra. This film was released in 1954 under the banner of Mitrani Limited.

Plot

Cast
 Anil Chatterjee
 Dhiraj Bhattacharya
 Nripati Chattopadhyay
 Tulsi Chakraborty
 Nabadwip Haldar
 Sabitri Chatterjee
 Sukhen Das
 Tripti Mitra
 Dhiraj Das
 Manjusree Chattopadhyay

References

External links
 

1954 films
1954 drama films
Bengali-language Indian films
Indian drama films
1950s Bengali-language films
Films directed by Premendra Mitra